Relaxation of the Asshole is a live comedy album by Robert Pollard. All of its tracks are outtakes from his onstage banter at various concerts. It was given a rating of "(1)0.0" in a review by Pitchfork Media, giving it a dual rating of 0.0 and 10.0.

Track listing

 "Do You Like Rim Rock?" 1:58  
 "They Call Me the Kid" 2:00  
 "The Answer" 0:56  
 "We Don't Do Technology" 2:36  
 "Hopeless, Pathetic Alcoholics" 0:59  
 "What a Mother Does for Her Son" 1:49  
 "Funk Zeus" 0:59  
 "Whiskey Shits" 0:43  
 "Bozo the Fucking Clown" 1:43  
 "Cocker, Meatloaf and Daltrey" 1:24  
 "Brownie Cop" 1:27  
 "What Is Tricky Woo?" 2:18  
 "Space Tractor" 0:39  
 "The "Are You Old Enough to Get Beer" Game Part I" 1:33  
 "The "Are You Old Enough to Get Beer" Game Part II" 1:49  
 "Where the Beer Flows Like Wine/8 to 5" 1:32  
 "They Might Look Good but They Ain't Good" 0:46  
 "Money" 1:41  
 "Another Dead Soldier" 1:00  
 "In Rock 'n' Roll You Never Lose" 3:57  
 "Thank You" 0:30  
 "We're the Rock 'n' Roll Petrified Forest/The Freaks vs. The Jocks" 4:22  
 "Is There a Grandfather Clause for People Who Need a Cigarette Really Bad?" 1:28  
 "My Brother’s a Better Guitar Player Than Joan Jett" 1:35  
 "Here's the Plan: Encore" 0:28

Robert Pollard albums
Live comedy albums
Spoken word albums by American artists
2005 live albums